Manel del Valle Zafra, Ph.D. (1992), is a Spanish chemist, who is active in the field of analytical chemistry; he is a professor of the Autonomous University of Barcelona (AUB) and founder of the university Group of sensors and biosensors.

References

Literature 
 C. S. Pundir, Seema Jakhar, Vinay Narwal. Determination of urea with special emphasis on biosensors: A review // Biosensors and Bioelectronics. — 2019. — January (vol. 123). — P. 36–50. — ISSN 0956-5663. — DOI:10.1016/j.bios.2018.09.067.
 Mahdi Ghasemi-Varnamkhasti, Constantin Apetrei, Jesus Lozano, Amarachukwu Anyogu. Potential use of electronic noses, electronic tongues and biosensors as multisensor systems for spoilage examination in foods // Trends in Food Science & Technology. — 2018. — October (vol. 80). — P. 71–92. — ISSN 0924-2244. — DOI:10.1016/j.tifs.2018.07.018.

Web-sources 
 

Living people
Spanish chemists
Academic staff of the Autonomous University of Barcelona
Year of birth missing (living people)